The 2004 Florida Gators baseball team represented the University of Florida in the sport of baseball during the 2004 college baseball season. The Gators competed in Division I of the National Collegiate Athletic Association (NCAA) and the Eastern Division of the Southeastern Conference (SEC). They played their home games at Alfred A. McKethan Stadium, on the university's Gainesville, Florida campus. The team was coached by Pat McMahon, who was in his third season at Florida.

Roster

Schedule 

! style="background:#FF4A00;color:white;"| Regular season
|- valign="top" 

|- align="center" bgcolor="ddffdd"
| February 7 ||||No. 15
| McKethan Stadium ||14–0
|Hoyman (1–0)
|Long (0–1)
|None
|3,185
|1–0||–
|- align="center" bgcolor="ddffdd"
| February 8 ||Gardner–Webb||No. 15
| McKethan Stadium ||8–4
|Falkenbach (1–0)
|Ward (0–1)
|O'Day (1)
|1,621
|2–0||–
|- align="center" bgcolor="ddffdd"
| February 13 ||at No. 1 Miami (FL)Rivalry||No. 15
|Mark Light StadiumCoral Gables, FL||3–0
|Hoyman (2–0)
|Cockroft (0–1)
|O'Day (2)
|4,513
|3–0||–
|- align="center" bgcolor="ffdddd"
| February 14 ||at No. 1 Miami (FL)Rivalry||No. 15
|Mark Light Stadium||1–4
|Bongiovanni (1–0)
|Porter (0–1)
|Carrillo (1)
|3,774
|3–1||–
|- align="center" bgcolor="ffdddd"
| February 15 ||at No. 1 Miami (FL)Rivalry||No. 15
|Mark Light Stadium||5–19
|Gil (1–0)
|Fuchs (0–1)
|Perez (1)
|2,632
|3–2||–
|- align="center" bgcolor="ddffdd"
| February 18 ||||No. 19
| McKethan Stadium ||11–5
|Ball (1–0)
|Patrick (1–3)
|None
|1,295
|4–2||–
|- align="center" bgcolor="ffdddd"
| February 20 ||||No. 19
| McKethan Stadium ||8–9
|Weiser (1–0)
|O'Day (0–1)
|None
|1,723
|4–3||–
|- align="center" bgcolor="ddffdd"
| February 21 ||Miami (OH)||No. 19
| McKethan Stadium ||4–3
|Falkenbach (2–0)
|Day (0–1)
|None
|2,012
|5–3||–
|- align="center" bgcolor="ddffdd"
| February 22 ||Miami (OH)||No. 19
| McKethan Stadium ||9–8
|Boss (1–0)
|Reineke (0–1)
|Roberson (1)
|2,052
|6–3||–
|- align="center" bgcolor="ddffdd"
| February 25 ||||No. 21
| McKethan Stadium ||9–4
|Ball (2–0)
|Taylor (0–1)
|Falkenbach (1)
|519
|7–3||–
|- align="center" bgcolor="ddffdd"
| February 26 ||Michigan||No. 21
| McKethan Stadium ||20–77
|Sanabria (1–0)
|Brauer (0–1)
|None
|634
|8–3||–
|- align="center" bgcolor="ddffdd"
| February 28 ||||No. 21
| McKethan Stadium ||5–3
|Hoyman (3–0)
|Mikrut (1–1)
|None
|2,382
|9–3||–
|- align="center" bgcolor="ddffdd"
| February 29 ||Northwestern||No. 21
| McKethan Stadium ||12–3
|Falkenbach (3–0)
|Brauer (0–1)
|None
|2,133
|10–3||–
|-

|- align="center" bgcolor="ddffdd"
| March 1  ||Northwestern||No. 19|| McKethan Stadium ||6–3||Ball (3–0)||Konecny (0–2)||O'Day (3)||1,437||11–3||–
|- align="center" bgcolor="ddffdd"
| March 3  ||at ||No. 19||Melching FieldDeLand, FL||12–8||Falkenbach (4–0)||McCuen (3–1)||O'Day (4)||2,248||12–3||–
|- align="center" bgcolor="ddffdd"
| March 5  ||||No. 19|| McKethan Stadium ||8–7||Roberson (1–0)||Driscoll (0–1)||None||2,158||13–3||–
|- align="center" bgcolor="ddffdd"
| March 6  ||Purdue||No. 19|| McKethan Stadium ||8–3||Falkenbach (5–0)||Karpel (0–1)||None||2,528||14–3||–
|- align="center" bgcolor="ddffdd"
| March 7  ||Purdue||No. 19|| McKethan Stadium ||3–2||Roberson (2–0)||Toneguzzi (1–1)||O'Day (5)||1,537||15–3||–
|- align="center" bgcolor="ddffdd"
| March 12  ||||No. 14|| McKethan Stadium ||14–8||Hoyman (4–0)||Davidson (0–1)||None||1,567||16–3||–
|- align="center" bgcolor="ddffdd"
| March 13  ||Brown||No. 14|| McKethan Stadium ||6–510||O'Day (1–1)||Hagerty (0–1)||None||1,622||17–3||–
|- align="center" bgcolor="ddffdd"
| March 14  ||Brown||No. 14|| McKethan Stadium ||14–1||Ball (4–0)||Cramphin (0–1)||None||1,427||18–3||–
|- align="center" bgcolor="ffdddd"
| March 17  ||||No. 12|| McKethan Stadium ||5–9||Bumgardner (1–0)||Porter (0–2)||None||2,153||18–4||–
|- align="center" bgcolor="ddffdd"
| March 19  ||No. 15 Arkansas||No. 12|| McKethan Stadium ||11–1||Hoyman (5–0)||Lennerton (0–2)||None||2,660||19–4||1–0
|- align="center" bgcolor="ffdddd"
| March 20  ||No. 15 Arkansas||No. 12|| McKethan Stadium ||2–8||Boyce (3–1)||Falkenbach (5–1)||Hall (2)||2,183||19–5||1–1
|- align="center" bgcolor="ddffdd"
| March 21  ||No. 15 Arkansas||No. 12|| McKethan Stadium ||7–610||O'Day (2–1)||Sawatski (2–2)||None||1,775||20–5||2–1
|- align="center" bgcolor="ddffdd"
| March 24  ||||No. 14|| McKethan Stadium ||11–6||Porter (1–2)||Grant (1–2)||None||1,621||21–5||–
|- align="center" bgcolor="ddffdd"
| March 26  ||at ||No. 14||Cliff Hagan StadiumLexington, KY||8–4||Hoyman (6–0)||Gibson (2–1)||None||1,100||22–5||3–1
|- align="center" bgcolor="ddffdd"
| March 27  ||at Kentucky||No. 14||Cliff Hagan Stadium||17–6||Ball (5–0)||Scott (4–1)||Roberson (2)||982||23–5||4–1
|- align="center" bgcolor="ddffdd"
| March 28  ||at Kentucky||No. 14||Cliff Hagan Stadium||8–1||Boss (2–0)||Snipp (1–3)||Falkenbach (2)||864||24–5||5–1
|- align="center" bgcolor="ddffdd"
| March 31  ||No. 10 Rivalry||No. 8|| McKethan Stadium ||7–611||O'Day (3–1)||Chambliss (0–1)||None||5,663||25–5||–
|-

|- align="center" bgcolor="ffdddd"
| April 2  ||||No. 8|| McKethan Stadium ||5–10||Lubrano (3–2)||Roberson (2–1)||Startup (4)||3,276||25–6||5–2
|- align="center" bgcolor="ffdddd"
| April 3  ||Georgia||No. 8|| McKethan Stadium ||5–8||Ruthven (3–0)||Ball (5–1)||Startup (5)||3,328||25–7
|5–3
|- align="center" bgcolor="ffdddd"
| April 4  ||Georgia||No. 8|| McKethan Stadium ||5–9||Boggs (1–0)||Boss (2–1)||None||2,545||25–8
|5–4
|- align="center" bgcolor="ffdddd"
| April 9  ||at No. 9 South Carolina||No. 17||Sarge Frye FieldColumbia, SC||4–510||Hempy (1–1)||Falkenbach (5–2)||None||4,827||25–9
|5–5
|- align="center" bgcolor="ddffdd"
| April 10  ||at No. 9 South Carolina||No. 17||Sarge Frye Field||9–8||O'Day (4–1)||Blackwell (2–2)||None||4,552||26–9||6–5
|- align="center" bgcolor="ffdddd"
| April 11  ||at No. 9 South Carolina||No. 17||Sarge Frye Field||6–710||Hempy (2–1)||Falkenbach (5–3)||None||2,951||26–10||6–6
|- align="center" bgcolor="ffdddd"
| April 16  ||at ||No. 19||Dudy Noble FieldStarkville, MS||2–11||Johnson (2–1)||Boss (2–2)||None||7,693||26–11||6–7
|- align="center" bgcolor="ddffdd"
| April 17  ||at Mississippi State||No. 19||Dudy Noble Field||16–6||Hoyman (7–0)||Doolittle (2–1)||None||10,617||27–11
|7–7
|- align="center" bgcolor="ddffdd"
| April 18  ||at Mississippi State||No. 19||Dudy Noble Field||8–3||Falkenbach (6–3)||Lacher (3–5)||None||7,252||28–11
|8–7
|- align="center" bgcolor="ffdddd"
| April 21  ||at No. 12 Florida StateRivalry||No. 21||Dick Howser StadiumTallahassee, FL||4–16||Jones (3–2)||Sanabria (1–1)||None||5,525||28–12||–
|- align="center" bgcolor="ddffdd"
| April 23  ||||No. 21|| McKethan Stadium ||5–3||Falkenbach (7–3)||Sowers (6–3)||None||2,547||29–12
|9–7
|- align="center" bgcolor="ddffdd"
| April 24  ||Vanderbilt||No. 21|| McKethan Stadium ||4–2||Hoyman (8–0)||Lewis (4–4)||None||2,362||30–12
|10–7
|- align="center" bgcolor="ddffdd"
| April 25  ||Vanderbilt||No. 21|| McKethan Stadium ||3–210||O'Day (5–1)||Rote (1–3)||None||2,307||31–12
|11–7
|- align="center" bgcolor="ddffdd"
| April 30  ||No. 19 ||No. 13|| McKethan Stadium ||7–4||Boss (3–2)||Hughey (6–2)||Falkenbach (3)||1,456||32–12
|12–7
|-

|- align="center" bgcolor="ddffdd"
| May 1 ||No. 19 Auburn||No. 13|| McKethan Stadium ||11–8||Hoyman (9–0)||Madden (1–1)||None||2,060||33–12||13–7
|- align="center" bgcolor="ddffdd"
| May 2 ||No. 19 Auburn||No. 13|| McKethan Stadium ||22–8||Pete (1–0)||Bell (2–2)||None||1,737||34–12
|14–7
|- align="center" bgcolor="ffdddd"
| May 7 ||at ||No. 10||Tuscaloosa, AL
|0–2||LeBlanc (7–4)||Boss (3–3)||None||4,317||34–13||14–8
|- align="center" bgcolor="ddffdd"
| May 8 ||at Alabama||No. 10||||8–5||Hoyman (10–0)||Johnson (2–3)||None||4,528||35–13
|15–8
|- align="center" bgcolor="ddffdd"
| May 9 ||at Alabama||No. 10||||6–58||O'Day (6–1)||Norris (1–1)||None||4,277||36–13
|16–8
|- align="center" bgcolor="ddffdd"
| May 12 ||Florida StateRivalry||No. 6|| McKethan Stadium ||3–2||O'Day (7–1)||Lynch (3–4)||None||5,469||37–13
|–
|- align="center" bgcolor="ffdddd"
| May 14 ||No. 18 ||No. 6|| McKethan Stadium ||2–4||Holliman (8–2)||Boss (3–4)||Head (5)||3,047||37–14||16–9
|- align="center" bgcolor="ffdddd"
| May 15 ||No. 18 Ole Miss||No. 6|| McKethan Stadium ||1–3||Cupps (3–2)||Hoyman (10–1)||Thompson (2)||2,560||37–15||16–10
|- align="center" bgcolor="ffdddd"
| May 16 ||No. 18 Ole Miss||No. 6|| McKethan Stadium ||9-1010||Thompson (3–0)||Falkenbach (7–4)||None||2,105||37–16||16–11
|- align="center" bgcolor="ffdddd"
| May 21 ||at ||No. 18||Knoxville, TN
|4–5||Drucker (7–3)||Falkenbach (7–5)||None||1,257||37–17||16–12
|- align="center" bgcolor="ffdddd"
| May 22 ||at Tennessee||No. 18||||7–9||Hicklen (4–2)||Falkenbach (7–6)||None||1,765||37–18||16–13
|- align="center" bgcolor="ddffdd"
| May 23 ||at Tennessee||No. 18||||5–3||Falkenbach (8–6)||Cobb (3–3)||Ball (1)||1,814||38–18||17–13
|-

|-
! style="background:#FF4A00;color:white;"| Post-season
|-

|- align="center" bgcolor="ddffdd"
| May 26  ||vs. No. 11 ||No. 25||Metropolitan StadiumHoover, AL||5–410||O'Day (8–1)||Determann (5–4)||None||–||39–18||1–0
|- align="center" bgcolor="ffdddd"
| May 27  ||vs. Vanderbilt||No. 25||Metropolitan Stadium||0–3||Mullins (8–2)||Boss (3–5)||Lewis (2)||–||39–19||1–1
|- align="center" bgcolor="ddffdd"
| May 28  ||vs. No. 10 Georgia||No. 25||Metropolitan Stadium||7–0||Falkenbach (9–6)||Hyle (7–2)||None||–||40–19||2–1
|- align="center" bgcolor="ffdddd"
| May 29  ||vs. Vanderbilt||No. 25||Metropolitan Stadium||5–612||Lewis (6–4)||Porter (1–3)||None||3,136||40–20||2–2
|-

|- align="center" bgcolor="ddffdd"
| June 4  ||vs. ||||Bricktown BallparkOklahoma City, OK||12–1||Hoyman (11–1)||Pappariella (7–3)||None||2,250||41–20||1–0
|- align="center" bgcolor="ddffdd"
| June 5  ||vs. ||||Bricktown Ballpark||4–3||Falkenbach (10–6)||Whisler (3–5)||None||1,981||42–20
|2–0
|- align="center" bgcolor="ddffdd"
| June 6  ||vs. UCLA||||Bricktown Ballpark||11–0||Boss (4–5)||Miltenberger (3–2)||None||2,341||43–20
|3–0
|-

|- align="center" bgcolor="ffdddd"
| June 12  ||at No. 1 Miami (FL)Rivalry||No. 17||Mark Light Stadium||7–8||Orta (2–0)||Hoyman (11–2)||Gil (5)||5,097||43–21||0–1
|- align="center" bgcolor="ffdddd"
| June 13  ||at No. 1 Miami (FL)Rivalry||No. 17||Mark Light Stadium||1–3||Carrillo (11–0)||||None||4,853||43–22||0–2
|-

Rankings from Collegiate Baseball. All times Eastern. Retrieved from FloridaGators.com

See also 
 Florida Gators
 List of Florida Gators baseball players

References

External links 
 Gator Baseball official website

Florida Gators baseball seasons
Florida Gators baseball team
Florida Gators
Florida